You Can't Do That on Stage Anymore, Vol. 6 is the last of six double-disc collection volumes of live performances by Frank Zappa recorded between 1970 and 1988. All of the material on Disc one has a sexual theme. Zappa used the monologue in "Is That Guy Kidding or What?", to ridicule Peter Frampton's album I'm in You with its double entendre title and pop pretensions. Disc two includes performances from Zappa's shows between 1976 and 1981 at the Palladium in New York City, as well as material like "The Illinois Enema Bandit" and "Strictly Genteel" that he frequently used as closing songs at concerts. It was released on October 23, 1992, under the label Rykodisc.

Track listing
All songs written, composed and arranged by Frank Zappa.

Personnel
 Frank Zappa – conductor, main performer, guitar, vocals, synthesizer, producer
 Mark Volman – vocals
 Howard Kaylan – vocals
 Lisa Popeil – vocals
Denny Walley – slide guitar, vocals
 Ike Willis – guitar, vocals
 Adrian Belew – guitar, vocals (tracks 2, 8, 10, 32)
 Ray White – guitar, vocals
 Warren Cuccurullo – guitar
 Steve Vai – guitar
 Mike Keneally – guitar, synthesizer, vocals
 Bobby Martin – keyboards, vocals
 Bob Harris – keyboards, vocals
 Peter Wolf – keyboards
 Allan Zavod – keyboards
 George Duke – keyboards
 Tommy Mars – keyboards
 Ian Underwood – keyboards, alto saxophone
 Lady Bianca – keyboards, vocals on "Wind up Workin' in a Gas Station"
 Patrick O'Hearn – bass guitar
 Jeff Simmons – bass guitar
 Arthur Barrow – bass guitar
 Scott Thunes – bass guitar
 Tom Fowler – bass guitar
 Ralph Humphrey – drums
 Vinnie Colaiuta – drums
 Aynsley Dunbar – drums
 Terry Bozzio – drums
 Chad Wackerman – drums, electronic percussion
Ed Mann – electric percussion, percussion, backing vocals, marimba
 Paul Carman – soprano saxophone, alto saxophone, baritone saxophone
 Napoleon Murphy Brock – saxophone, vocals
 Albert Wing – tenor saxophone
 Michael Brecker – tenor saxophone on "Black Napkins"
 Kurt McGettrick – baritone saxophone, contrabass clarinet, bass saxophone
 Walt Fowler – flugelhorn, synthesizer, trumpet
 L. Shankar – violin
 Jean-Luc Ponty – violin
 George Douglas – engineer
 Bob Stone – engineer

References

External links
 Lyrics and information
 Release details

Frank Zappa live albums
1992 live albums
Rykodisc live albums
Live at the Fillmore East albums
Sequel albums